Vetas is a town and municipality in the Santander Department in northeastern Colombia.

Climate
Vetas has a tundra climate (ET) with moderate to light rainfall and very cold weather year-round.

References

Municipalities of Santander Department